St Peter's College is a Catholic secondary school for boys in the Edmund Rice tradition, and dedicated to St Peter. it is located in the central Auckland area of Grafton, Auckland, New Zealand. With a roll of over 1300, the school is one of the largest Catholic schools in New Zealand. St Peter's College was established in 1939 as a successor of Auckland's earliest school (Mr Powell's School, established in 1841) and of St Peter's School, founded in 1857. However, Auckland also had another Catholic secondary school dedicated to St Peter, Hato Petera College or St Peter's Māori College, which existed for 90 years from 1928 until 2018 in Northcote.

The Outhwaite family, who acquired the Mountain Rd land around 1841, donated the site of St Peter's College. The Christian Brothers provided staff for the college for 70 years.

St Peter's is the oldest existing Catholic boys' school in Auckland still on its original site. For nearly 50 years, the school had direct access to an adjacent railway station, specifically created for the college and known initially as the "St Peter's College station". The school was integrated into the state system along with 240 other New Zealand Catholic schools in 1982.

The school aims to achieve a diverse, family-oriented, community and good exam results.

The School

Ethos and service
In discussing the changes in the school over the years, Monsignor Paul Farmer who was a pupil from 1960 to 1965, chaplain in the 1970s and was the school chaplain in 2021, stated that apart from the changes in popular culture (like the Beatles hair styles in the early 1960s which the Brothers tried unsuccessfully to fight), in 2021, the boys were much easier to manage and were treated with much greater respect.

Farmer said that when he was a boy and during the 1970s, there was a much greater degree of uniformity. “It didn’t matter who you were or where you came from, whether you were intelligent or dumb, one shirt fitted everybody. It was very much a macho male culture. It was a shouting and noisy culture.” He said that all that had changed., “I think there is much more respect for the individual boy, for the differences in character, for the different places in which people learn. And the staff, I think, are much more respectful overall of the students than they were previously. I think that is why the students are so much more able to be managed and to be respectful. It is a much more respectful place. I think it is just the changes that have taken place in society that have brought this about.”

All St Peter’s students are required to complete service work ("any unpaid work that is not for relatives") as part of their life at the College.

Roll
St Peter's College draws enrolments from throughout the city. The ethnic composition of students in 2016 was (generally): European/Pākehā 54%; Māori 10%; Polynesian 17% (including Samoan and Tongan); Asian 16% (including Chinese, Indian and Philippine people) and others 3%. There were approximately 134 paid staff (teaching and support staff). The school offers for senior years both the National Certificate of Educational Achievement assessment system (NCEA) and the Cambridge International Examinations (CIE).

Houses 

The St Peter's College houses are the basis of organisation in the school by year. Each year level has six house classes and each house class is the unit of attendance, pastoral care, competitive activity and many daily activities. There are house leaders (students) and house leaders (staff) assigned to each. 

The houses and their colours and eponyms are:
 Bodkin – red – Dominic Fursey Bodkin
 Lynch – yellow – John Barnabas Lynch
 Nolan – blue – Patrick Joseph Nolan
 O'Driscoll – grey – Francis Pius O'Driscoll
 Rice – black – Edmund Ignatius Rice
 Treacy – green –  Patrick Ambrose Treacy

Brothers Fursey Bodkin, Barnabas Lynch, Joseph Nolan, and their leader, Patrick Ambrose Treacy were Christian Brothers who arrived from Ireland in Melbourne on 15 November 1868 to establish the religious institute in Australia. In 1875 Brother Treacy visited Bishop Patrick Moran, first Catholic Bishop of Dunedin, and promised him a community of Christian Brothers. In 1876 Brother Bodkin was the leader of the new Dunedin community, the first Christian Brothers community in New Zealand. Bodkin, Lynch, Nolan and Treacy Houses date from the 1940s. O'Driscoll and Rice Houses were set up in 2011. Edmund Ignatius Rice was the founder of the Christian Brothers and Brother O'Driscoll was the foundation headmaster of the college.

Music, culture and sport 
St. Peter's places great emphasis on music education and all year 7 and 8 students receive musical tuition and learn to play a musical instrument. There are many instrumental groups covering the gamut from Jazz to Classical music. The school continues a strong choral tradition. 

The culturally diverse roll has contributed to the school being successful in the Pacific Islands cultural schools competition, ASB Polyfest, especially in the Samoan section which St Peter's first won in 2007. The college repeated that in 2008, 2009, 2010 and 2011. St. Peter's finished second two years in a row 2012 and 2013 but won in 2014, 2015 and 2021. Success has also come with the Tongan group Kailao in 2021. In 2020, for the first time in the history of the college, the Kapa haka group qualified for Division One at ASB Polyfest. 

In 2014 sports played by St Peter's included: archery, athletics, badminton, basketball, cricket, cycling, distance running, football, golf, hockey, lacrosse, lawn bowls, rowing (started 1941), rugby union, snow sports, softball, squash, swimming, table tennis, tennis, touch football, triathlon, volleyball, and water polo. In 2022 about 1000 St Peter’s College students participated in Winter sports in more than 60 teams.

History

The original schools

Mr Powell's School (1841)

Auckland's first school was a Catholic school for boys, that commenced on 27 September 1841. It was established by Catholic laymen of Auckland following the first visit of Bishop Pompallier. The teacher was Edmund Powell (who was a leading layman also involved in building St Patrick's Church, later consecrated as a cathedral), and classes were first held in his home in Shortland Crescent. This school appears to have existed only for a short time.

St Peter's School (1857–1885)

In 1857, St Peter's School was established by a group of laymen (Messrs Coolahan, Boylan, Dignan, McGauran and O'Rafferty) led by Father O'Hara, the curate at St Patrick's Cathedral, as Auckland's first Catholic secondary school for boys. In that year Bishop Pompallier prepared a list of church schools for the Government and for "propaganda" which stated: "St Peter's Select School is established for the more advanced boys. The Greek, Latin, French, Italian and German languages are taught in it, also Geometry, Mensuration, Arithmetic, Geography, English Grammar etc ... Terms per Annum 12.0.0 for each pupil." The school had a board of governors composed of its founders which included the Member of Parliament, Patrick Dignan. Classes commenced in rented accommodation, probably in Drake St, Freemans Bay. John Logan Campbell donated a sum of £500 and a block of land on the corner of Pitt and Wellington Streets. A brick school building was built there. The founding teacher was Richard O'Sullivan and, during his tenure, the school was often identified with him (St Peter's boys were said to be "educated by Richard O'Sullivan" rather than by the school). Amongst his students were John Sheehan, Joseph Tole, Peter Dignan and Charles and William Outhwaite. O'Sullivan resigned in 1861. In 1865 the teacher was Peter Morand.

Bishop Pompallier made an annual inspection of the school. On 16 December 1864 he visited the school along with some priests and many parents. The proceedings were commenced by an address "to the Right Reverend Dr Pompallier, Bishop of Auckland", delivered by a pupil, Laurence Lorigan, on behalf of all the pupil's.

Earlier in 1864, St Peter's School gave an address to Bishop Pompallier on his feast day, the feast of St John the Baptist. That address was delivered by Martin Maher on behalf of the pupils.

St Peter's School was also prominent in St Patrick's Day celebrations. On Friday 17 March 1865, St Peter's boys together with pupils of other Catholic schools began their celebrations with a Pontifical High Mass whose principal celebrant was Bishop Pompallier, in the cathedral.  After addresses to the Bishop, the pupils went to the "paddocks" of Peter Grace Esq where "the sports for the youths consisted of feats of bat and ball, football etc. etc. A very spirited cricket match came off between 11 students of St Francis de Sales School [(a girls' school)] and a corresponding number of St Peter's School, the former being the victors in the game". In 1867 the celebration occurred on Monday 18 March. After Mass, the addresses to the bishop were read by a pupil of St Patrick's School and by "Master Anthony [Patrick] Martin, son of Mr Anthony Martin of Hobson St" on behalf of St Peter's. The pupils then went to paddocks of Mr Dinnin on Ponsonby Road for sports, entertainments and "refreshments".

In the 1870s and 1880s, Mr B Hammill was a well-known teacher. He was said to have a "first-class certificate from the Irish Board of Education" and to be "enthusiastically devoted to his profession". Mr Peter Leonard was another prominent teacher who went on to teach at other schools in Auckland. In 1874, a report of the annual public examination of the boys attending St Peter's, presided over by Bishop Croke, stated that there was a "regular and good" attendance of about 70 pupils at the school. In 1879 St Peter's had a roll of 43. In 1881, Mr Cronin (who had "high certificates from the Irish and Auckland Education Boards") was a teacher at St Peter's School which in an advertisement for pupils also offered night classes ("7-9pm") to prepare pupils for "mercantile pursuits, civil service and teacher's examinations". In about 1884, St Peter's started to use a larger adjacent building as the number of pupils was exceeding the capacity of the brick school. In October 1884, William Mahoney, who received all his early education under Mr Hammill at St Peter's, paid a visit to the school on his return to New Zealand as a priest. He was Auckland's first New-Zealand-born priest. St Peter's School continued (largely, by then a primary school) until the Marist Brothers established their own school on the site in 1885.

Troubled establishment
Walter Steins S.J., third Catholic Bishop of Auckland (1879–1881) thought, that as they were a French congregation, the Marist Brothers might not be welcome in Auckland and that it would be better to invite the Irish Christian Brothers as most of the Catholics in Auckland were Irish. Steins's successor, John Luck OSB, fourth Catholic Bishop of Auckland (1881–1896), had no such qualms and invited the Marist Brothers to establish their school. An unsuccessful move may have been made in 1885 to open a Christian Brothers School.

Nearly 40 years later, in 1923, Henry Cleary, the sixth Catholic Bishop of Auckland, issued an invitation to the Christian Brothers to found a school. The Marist Brothers, well established at Sacred Heart College (then located in Richmond Road, Ponsonby), objected strongly and Cleary wrote to the Provincial of the Christian Brothers, Brother Barron, changing his offer to a primary school. As a result, the Christian Brothers lost interest.

Shortly after he became seventh Catholic Bishop of Auckland in 1929, James Liston renewed the invitation to the Christian Brothers, whose pupil he had been in Dunedin. This again aroused the opposition of the Marist Brothers. They were concerned that a new boys' Form I to VI school would take enrolments from Sacred Heart College and would diminish their revenue. Unmoved by the Marist Brothers' opposition, Liston requested his old Dunedin classmate, Brother Michael James Benignus Hanrahan (Brother Benignus), the Christian Brothers provincial, to provide brothers to staff the school. This was agreed to.

A contractor cleared the Mountain Road site in 1931 and it was expected that the school would open in 1933. But financial problems caused delays. The Marist Brothers appealed to the Apostolic Delegate to Australia and New Zealand, resident in Sydney, and to the Sacred Congregation of Religious in Rome. They believed that Bishop Cleary had promised them the St Peter's School site but as no written record could be found, Bishop Liston was informed by the Sacred Congregation that he could invite the Christian Brothers and the Apostolic Delegate, Archbishop Giovanni Panico, ruled "that the Bishop is free to make whatever provision he may decide in the matter". The Marist Brothers accepted this ruling, but unhappily.

Outhwaites, construction and opening

The school was constructed on the corner of Khyber Pass Road and Mountain Road, a site which had been given to the church for educational purposes by the Outhwaite family a pioneering family of Auckland. The family acquired the site in 1841. Isa Outhwaite, the last surviving member of that family, bequeathed the site of the college and also a part of the fund required for its erection. The Outhwaites, who lived nearby, had pastured livestock on the site. The dedication of the college to St Peter was not only a specific revival of the earlier St Peter's School in Auckland, but also referred to the first Catholic school in New Zealand opened in Kororareka in 1840 and dedicated to St Peter. The foundation also commemorated the beginning of the Catholic Church in New Zealand in 1838 when Bishop Pompallier arrived in New Zealand and set up the Marist Mission in the Bay of Islands.

The Christian Brothers arrived in Auckland from Australia and the South Island for the 1939 school year. They were accommodated by the parish priest of Remuera, Monsignor J. J. Bradley, in his presbytery until the Brothers' residence was habitable. Bradley, who had been a pupil of the Christian Brothers in Ireland, was responsible for the laying out of the grounds of the school, which took ten months to complete. However, work continued until 1941 on the development of Reeves Road (a street that has now disappeared as it has been incorporated as the entrance to St. Peter's College), the building of stone walls, and the very significant soil transfer from the netball courts to level the playing fields was accomplished largely by workers on the Government Relief scheme following the Great Depression. These workers worked on the project for three years and finished it on 1 November 1941. The school grounds consisted of three different levels, i.e. the netball court level (from 2010, the site of the St Peter's Sports Complex), the old tennis court level (now filled in under the playing field level) and the playing field level (called the "St Peter's College oval"). Originally, the quadrangle of the college was not paved but was covered in heavy ash from the Auckland Gas works in Freemans Bay.
left: The construction of the Christian Brothers' House, St Peter's College, Auckland, 1938

The school was opened on Sunday, 29 January 1939 by Bishop Liston and in the presence of Hon. H. G. R. Mason, (Attorney-General and local member of parliament – for the Auckland Suburbs electorate), the Mayor of Auckland, Sir Ernest Davis, and Mr Justice Callan of the Supreme Court (who had been a pupil of the Christian Brothers in Dunedin and had also been a classmate of Liston's). Br Keniry represented the Provincial of the Christian Brothers, Brother Hanrahan, at the opening. The opening took place on a wet afternoon and, as he read his speech, Bishop Liston was sheltered under an umbrella held by the foundation headmaster of the college, Brother F.P. O'Driscoll. In spite of the rain, many friends and well-wishers participated in the opening.

After referring to the bequest of the Outhwaite family and making placatory remarks about the Marist Brothers, Liston welcomed the Christian Brothers. 
He said that they were "here at the invitation of the Bishop to take charge of St Peter's school and to have their part, along with the Marist Brothers and other religious communities, in our Catholic education system. They have their own traditions to give us, formed in the society's work of teaching since 1802, and the fruit of the experience gathered, to speak only of Australia and New Zealand, of over 500 Brothers teaching more than 20,000 boys". Liston added, " ... if I know the Brothers at all, the boys under their care will be put to hard work – an excellent thing – and teachers will not do for them what they should do for themselves. The thought of the years ahead and of the eternal life will be regarded as of first importance. Teachers will feel it their daily duty to fit the boys to bear life's burdens with a spirit of nobility and to meet life's problems with unfaltering courage". At the conclusion of his speech, Bishop Liston said, "This is a very happy day for me indeed for I owe much more than I can say to the training I received at the hands of the Christian Brothers in Dunedin long years ago."

The original school buildings opened in 1939 on the  Outhwaite site consisted of an incomplete two-storied class-block (now the Bro P. O'Driscoll Building) and an incomplete two-storied residence (the brother's residence). They were designed by William Henry Gummer (1884–1966), a student of Sir Edwin Lutyens and architect of some notable Auckland buildings such as the Dilworth Building in Queen Street and the old Auckland railway station in Beach Road. He also designed the National War Memorial and carillon and National Art Gallery and Dominion Museum buildings in Wellington. The two original school buildings were fully completed in 1944. In 1955 a statue of the Blessed Virgin Mary, paid for by the Christian Brothers Old Boys, was placed in the alcove on the Bro P O'Driscoll Building above the quadrangle.

1939 – Commencement challenges
On Monday, 6 February 1939, St Peter's College opened its doors with a roll of 183 pupils, aged from 11 to 14 (i.e. from Form I to Form IV). Five brothers comprised the original staff: Brothers O'Driscoll,  Killian, Rapp, Skehan and Carroll. Brother Skehan had been at St. Kevin's College, Oamaru and the others had been in Sydney.

The average size of the four classes in the first year of the college was thirty boys. But Form IV commenced with fourteen pupils. These had come from ten different schools. There had been no unity in the textbooks used in these schools, but also the boys had studied different subjects. By the end of the first term it was evident to the Brothers that there was quite a teaching problem and it was decided to start the second term of Form IV with Theorem One in Geometry and Lesson One in French, Latin, Algebra, etc. – all the start of Form III work. The object was to get through two complete years' work (Form III and Form IV – Years 9 and 10) in two terms (i.e. the second and third terms – from May to December). Many of the fourteen pupils transferred down to Form III. For the senior class, play or recreation time was cut in half. School was conducted on Saturday mornings, when the week's theoretical study of Chemistry was tested by practical experiments. "No text books were allowed on Saturdays, and woe betide any student who didn't know the properties and tests for various gases and metals and their respective weights". Brother O'Driscoll, a large man, vigorously thumped or pounded the blackboard to drive home important points. Several new blackboards had to be acquired. By the third term only four students were left – Bill Aitkin, Max Denize, Des and John Rosser. The following year (1940) Brother O'Driscoll allowed three to sit for Matriculation (University Entrance) and one for the Public Service Examination. All four passed. The first Dux of the college was Des Rosser in 1940. His twin brother John was dux in 1941. The brothers subsequently donated the Rosser Cup, presented each year for Dux of St Peter's College.

Great walls and new buildings

The transformation of the grounds, the development of Reeves Road, the planting of lawns, garden plots and the erection of the front stone wall along Reeves Road continued over the next few years. The trees planted were mostly Syzygium smithii (an Australian species – also known as Monkey Apple), along Reeves Rd, and, near the tennis courts, Puriri trees. "At the same time, tons of soil and rock were brought up from the site of the [netball] courts (now the site of the St Peter's College Sports Complex) to make the playing field. But the masterpiece of all the constructional work was the huge stone wall below the tennis courts [(and above the netball courts)]. The first pupils daily eagerly visited it as if it were some modern Great Wall of China, and watched in wonder as it took shape".

After the end of the Second World War, significant developments were: the opening of the college chapel in 1953 (see below); the building of the first prefabricated classroom block; and the conversion of the old bungalow used as a shelter shed and of a classroom to a library in the 1950s.

In 1961, St Peter's had the largest roll of any Catholic school in New Zealand, having 834 pupils. More building projects became necessary.

In the 1960s, the Brothers' residence was extended and a new science block consisting of science laboratories, classrooms and a demonstration room was built. This building was upgraded in the 1990s and is now called the Brother J. B. Lynch Science Laboratories. A large three-story set of classrooms (now called the Brother B E Ryan Building) plus assembly hall and squash courts were opened in the early 1970s.

Sport 
St Peter's College has a strong and successful sporting tradition. This tradition started early when in 1939 the college affiliated to the secondary schools' rugby union. In 1941 the college won the seventh grade rugby competition. On 21 March 1941 the first annual College swimming championships meeting was held at the Olympic pool, Newmarket. Softball also started early at St Peter's and it was recorded that College students were playing in the softball competitions in 1945. In 1981, St Peter's College won the inaugural national Secondary School's Softball Championship and other national championships in 1990, 1999, 2000, 2002 and 2003. It also won the Auckland Softball Premiership every year from 1994 until 2008, and several times since then. One sport promoted in the early days of the college was boxing. The school boxing championships were held annually, usually at the Municipal Hall, Newmarket. 

In the 1950s the athletics chant of the school (adapted by the Christian Brothers from their Australian schools) was urangabe, urangabe, urangabe uranga/Woolagalla, woolagalla, rumba/Flay them, beat them, yah mung do!/Christies, Christies, blue, gold, blue. One old boy, at SPC in the mid-1950s, wrote that the Christian Brothers (being then "Aussies") were not much interested in rugby but were more interested in cricket, "square-bashing" and athletics. However, John Tamihere, at St Peter's in the 1970s, remembered the Christian Brothers (by then mostly Kiwi) being very enthusiastic about Rugby. He wrote that if the Christian Brothers wanted a boy for the First XV, the boy didn't have much say in the matter. "They would walk around the school grounds at lunchtime sizing up" likely candidates to see if they might be any good. They picked out one boy because he looked usefully tall. "I'd rather play soccer", the boy protested, " ... but next minute there he was in the lineout, leaping." Under such pressure, Tamihere played for the college First XV (in 1975 and 1976) although he would have preferred to play Rugby league for the Point Chevalier Pirates and later for the Glenora Bears as his brothers did. He said that the college First XV at that time was composed of " ... not bad players", and they were " ... always competitive". "We didn't win a lot, but on the other hand we never really got hammered". "St Peter's used to play St Kentigern's, who were led out onto the field by their pipe band. When we played Anglican King's College there was no doubt this was a Catholic versus "Proddy" battle, though some of our toughest games were against other Catholic schools like St Paul's and Sacred Heart. If you think Māori society was tribal, you should have seen those Catholics". There is also strong traditional Rugby rivalry with other schools such as Liston College, De La Salle College, Auckland Grammar School, Kelston Boys' High School, Mt Albert Grammar School and the North Shore schools, Hato Petera College, Rosmini College and Westlake. An annual senior rugby fixture between Auckland Grammar and St Peter's (The Battle of the Bridge) is played for the Henry Cooper-Br. Paddy Ryan Rugby Challenge Cup in memory of headmasters in office in 1962 when St Peter's beat Grammar for the first time.

Amongst the college's Rugby highlights was winning by the First XV of the New Zealand Secondary School's Top Four Championship and the Auckland Secondary Schools Premiership in 1987.  The latter feat was repeated in 1988. The college won the Auckland Championship and the New Zealand First XV Knock out competition undefeated in 2000. Most recently, St Peter's won the Auckland Secondary Schools Premiership and the National First XV Championship final in 2018. The college has gained the Moascar Cup (national school 1st XV rugby honour) three times, in 1977, 2000 and 2018.

In 1980, Hugh McGahan, captain of the New Zealand National Rugby League side, "the Kiwis" from 1986 to 1990, also played for the college First XV, under similar pressure to that exerted on John Tamihere. However, McGahan stated that, in spite of the pressure, it "was a pleasure pulling on the school jersey" to represent the college. Although it has made a significant contribution to the sport, St Peter's College does not field Rugby league teams. However, many students play Soccer. The 1st XI compete in the Auckland Premier grade and were third at the NZ Football Championships in 2019. Basketball and hockey teams also compete in the Auckland Premier Grade.

The Cage and the motorway
In 1959, Archbishop Liston purchased  on Mountain Road opposite the school. This land was owned by New Zealand Breweries and had been part of the Great Northern Brewery, later called Lion Brewery, which stretched from Khyber Pass along Mountain Rd up as far as Seccombes Rd. Part of the land purchased had been used as tennis courts for the staff. The land became available because, from 1950, New Zealand Breweries was concentrating its beer production at the Captain Cook Brewery further down Khyber Pass towards Newmarket. The Lion Brewery site was therefore sold off, part to the New Zealand Distillary Company and part, which included the tennis courts, to the Bishop of Auckland for St Peter's College. The site was purchased from New Zealand Breweries for £11,000 per acre, a concessional price. The sum was paid by the parents of the school through fairs, raffles and money contributions. Students were involved in picking up stones and glass from the field, sometimes as a detention. The site was used as a rugby field (at first called "the Far Field" or "the New Field" and now, "the Cage"). Located on it is a sports' pavilion called the Brother P. C. Ryan Sports Pavilion. It is named for Brother "Paddy" Ryan, the headmaster at the time, who managed the purchase and transformation of the site. The pavilion replaced an earlier pavilion opened in 1960 (see below). In 2012 the Cage was refurbished into an Astro turf field suitable for playing rugby and soccer in all weathers and conditions.

Henry Cooper, the headmaster of nearby Auckland Grammar School, was also interested in this land for his school but the price New Zealand Breweries required for it (£30,000) was considered too high. Cooper was "particularly annoyed" that he failed to obtain the site as St Peter's got it for somewhat less than the price quoted to Grammar and which had been considered prohibitive by the Ministry of Works (which would have had to purchase the land for Grammar, a State school). However, Cooper attended the official opening of the resulting new St Peter's College pavilion and field on 19 November 1960 and he " ... offered the congratulations of the other schools of Auckland and expressed great pleasure that his friendly neighbours had obtained such a handsome new playing field".

Cooper used the episode in his argument for the transfer of the Mt Eden Prison quarries to Auckland Grammar for the creation of new sports fields for that school. He pointed out that the brewery site would have been very suitable for Grammar and that Grammar had been beaten to it by a "private school". The context of this was that the new Auckland Southern Motorway development was projected to take the main Grammar rugby field which lay between the two schools. Although St Peter's was to be less affected, Liston supported Auckland Grammar in its opposition to the motorway and the projected route. Auckland Grammar argued that the motorway was going to adversely affect "two great schools" and should either be abandoned or re-routed. However, one of Grammar's suggested alternative routes was to be "further down" Mountain Road, which would have taken the motorway either through St Peter's College or through the Catholic netball courts which were used by the college and are now part of it as the site of the sports complex. Either of these proposed alternative routes would also have taken out the newly acquired and developed rugby field.

Grammar lost its rugby field in 1964, but was compensated by the Mt Eden Prison quarries. St Peter's lost a small section of land on its south west extremity for the motorway on-ramp at Khyber Pass Rd and in return was sold Reeves Road and some prison houses at a concessional price. Reeves Rd disappeared as a street and much of the subsequent expansion of the school has taken place on its site. However, both Auckland Grammar and St Peter's have had to endure the adjacent motorway since 1965.

The railway station

For nearly fifty years St Peter's College had its own railway station, developed on the initiative of Brother T. A. Monagle in 1964, to cater for the large number of students from St Peter's College and Auckland Grammar School who arrived on the North or West train and had to alight at Mt Eden Station and walk to their schools. They had to cross busy roads and undertake an uncontrolled crossing of the railway line itself, to walk the ten minutes, under the walls of Mt Eden Prison, to their schools. Meanwhile the train had continued on its way following the same path to the north-west boundary of St Peter's. The railway station was first known as the St Peter's College station and only the "school trains" stopped there. Later, the station became a full stop with all passenger trains stopping and was known as the Boston Rd Station. 

Up to a third of the school's enrolment (i.e. 400 students) commutes to the college by train and uses the Grafton station (which replaced the Boston Rd Station).

Chapels

1939 chapel 
From its opening in 1939, the Christian Brothers had a small "but handsome" chapel upstairs in the Brothers' House. It was equipped by past pupils of the Christian Brothers, one of whom, Father J Mansfield, who sixty years previously had been a pupil of the Christian Brothers in Dublin, donated the altar. The chapel was furnished in oak. The altar was walnut and primavera wood, backed by a rich blue and gold hanging.

1953 chapel 
On 14 November 1953 a larger chapel was blessed and opened by Archbishop Liston. This was built mainly on the initiative of the chaplain of the school, Father Reginald Delargey. Funds were raised by the Old Boys, Men's and Ladies' Committees and the pupils. The chapel cost £3,300. £3,000 was raised by an appeal (£1,400 from parents, friends and Old Boys, and £750 from the pupils including £200 as a result of "self-denial" days). "The opening of the chapel was all the more satisfying because of the involvement of the pupils." This chapel was located between the Brothers' House and the main school building (now called the "Br O'Driscoll Building"). The chapel was rectangular. It had two aisles between which there were approximately ten pews which could accommodate a class or two for Mass or Benediction. On the other side of each aisle were the Brothers' chairs and prie-dieus at which they recited their office each day, heard Mass and kept their own devotional books. The chapel was dominated by a crucifix and a large altar fixed against the south end wall in those pre-Vatican II days. A free-standing altar later replaced this so that Mass could be said facing the congregation. On the left was also a shrine to Our Lady of Perpetual Succour, a devotion much encouraged by the Christian Brothers. On the South side of this icon was the door to a small sacristy which also served as a confessional for the school, where the school chaplain was available regularly. This sacristy issued onto a small cloister which connected the Brother's House with the school building. On the North side of the icon a door led from the chapel to the Brother's Common room and library in the Brothers' House. This also served as the general staff room for the college which was most useful to the lay teachers. There were folding doors along the northern or entrance end of the chapel. These doors could be opened so that extra congregants could be accommodated outside. From time to time Masses were celebrated al fresco there. Other events were also held there such as school prizegivings. At the 1955 prizegiving, Archbishop Liston "presided on a decorated balcony" in front of the chapel. "The chapel became a focal point and the good habit of a visit to the Blessed Sacrament before and after school [was] maintained over 60 years". This chapel was demolished to free up access to the Brother L. H. Wilkes Technology Block which was opened in 2001.

2001 chapel 
This was a temporary pre-fabricated building located near the northern end of the quadrangle of the college (also known as the "Top Yard") until it was removed to allow the permanent school chapel to be constructed on the site and opened in 2020.

2020 chapel 
"The Chapel of St Peter" was opened on 13 March 2020 in the upper yard of the school. It was built at an estimated cost of $3 million raised by the school community over more than a decade. It echoed the illuminated ,  inverted cross (Cross of Saint Peter) erected at the entrance to the college in 2017. Two hundred guests took part in the blessing ceremony led by the school chaplain, Monsignor Paul Farmer. The school (1300 students) performed a Haka Powhiri and then most students watched the rest of the opening ceremony via live-feed on a large screen in the adjacent school gymnasium. During the service, the altar was consecrated and relics of St Peter Chanel and Blessed Edmund Ignatius Rice were placed in it. The walls of the chapel were also anointed. The headmaster, Mr James Bentley said "that the building made a statement for all to see about what the college stood for and as a place of worship, not just for students and staff, but also for the wider community“. The first Mass was celebrated in the new chapel on Sunday, 15 March 2020.

The chapel is located adjacent to the school's top yard and it may be seen from Khyber Pass Road. The building was designed by Stevens Lawson Architects, the same firm that designed the inverted cross (which casts a shadow that is right side up during the day) at the college entrance. This inverted cross motif is also reproduced in the chapel. When sunlight pours through the chapel's skylight, an inverted cross shines through. The headmaster has said that the design for the chapel "presents a confident and identifiable cross to its most public face, not only to signify the building’s purpose and all that the cross stands for, but also to provide a public message of God’s love and our salvation". The main chapel houses two smaller chapels which are quiet places for reflection; one is a Blessed Sacrament chapel and the other a Reconciliation chapel. The chapel is designed to give the students the feeling of a sacred space as they walk into it.

Mass is celebrated in the chapel by the chaplain of the school or by visiting priests every Wednesday at lunchtime and all students are invited to attend. The chapel is open to all for prayer and guidance throughout the day. Large school liturgical events usually take place at city churches such as St Michael's Church, Remuera, St Benedict's Church, Newton, or St Patrick's Cathedral. The cathedral has been the normal setting for the important annual school celebration of St Peter's Day.

James Liston

 
Archbishop Liston, the founder of the college in 1939, presided at all the school prize-giving ceremonies from the first until his retirement in 1970.

At the 1970 ceremony Brother B E Ryan, the headmaster of the college, said, in the final presence of Liston, that St Peter's College might not have been created without Liston's decision, for which he was criticised (see above).

Liston often expressed gratitude publicly to the Christian Brothers' School in Dunedin where he had been a pupil on occasions involving Christian Brothers institutions. However, Liston's gratitude did have its limits. There is a well-known story at St Peter's College concerning the large Christian Brothers emblem above the main northern entrance to the original school building. In the course of the creation of that emblem in 1938 or 1939, Bishop Liston arrived to survey progress on the building of the school. He ordered work to stop on the emblem because the school was "his" and did not belong to the Christian Brothers; the emblem was completed in 2014. The college was "his" in the sense that it was (and is) owned directly by the Bishop of Auckland. Liston often acknowledged his debt to the Christian Brothers for establishing and maintaining St Peter's College.

In January 1943 Liston wrote to his old classmate Br Michael James Benignus Hanrahan, the Provincial of the Christian Brothers when the college was established, on the occasion of the latter's Golden Jubilee, saying that the school had always been what Hanrahan or himself would wish it to be.

When Liston died in 1976 the college formed a guard of honour for his funeral cortege from the Town Hall to Grafton Bridge.

Christian Brothers

The Christian Brothers provided staff for St Peter's College from its opening in 1939 until 2007. However, the numbers of brothers teaching at St Peter's College gradually declined from the 1970s. In 1975 there were 15 brothers teaching. In 1982 this number had reduced to eight. In 1988 it was 7, 4 in 1991, 2 in 1993, and 1 from 1994. From 1994 until July 2007, Bro. Paul Robertson was the only Christian Brother teaching at St Peter's College. He was the associate principal of the college.

The integration of St Peter's College into the state education system also " ... caused a 'church/state' separation of the [Christian Brothers] community from the institution". This was demonstrated particularly in the formal splitting of authority in the school between the school board of trustees and the principal of the college, and the new role of the former in staffing matters. As the Christian Brothers did not own the school, they could not appoint their representatives on the board. The proprietor's representatives where instead appointed by the school's owner, the Bishop of Auckland. In 1992 the Christian Brothers shifted from the college to a new community house in Queen Mary Avenue, Epsom, acquired because it was near St Peter's College. Brother L. H. Wilkes wrote about what this meant for the Christian Brothers community. "For years the dread of leaving St Peter's house hung over the community at St Peter's. In 1991 it was down to months and in early 1992 it was down to weeks and to days. Nobody actually spoke definitely about leaving but everyone knew it was inevitable. I could just not imagine the community in an ordinary house in an ordinary street ...". Some Brothers teaching at St Peter's College in the late 1980s moved to another community house in Mangere which soon closed. Apart from Brother Paul Robertson, the last serving Christian Brother to retain regular involvement with St Peter's College was Brother V. N. Cusack. He worked in the St Peter's tuckshop until 1997, arriving at 7.30am every school day to heat the pies. Mr Peter Watt ("Watty"), who was an old boy of St Peter's, and a Christian Brother from 1966 to 1981, taught at the college as a Brother from 1969 to 1972 and in 1980. He ceased to be a Christian Brother in 1981. He returned to St Peter's to teach Mathematics and coach cricket from 1986, retiring in 2016. He remained closely associated with the college until his death on 20 June 2018, in the college's 80th year.

In his Annual principal's report for 1988, Brother Prendergast described the characteristics of a Christian Brothers school as: the encouragement given to pupils to strive for scholastic excellence; a religious dimension; the cultivation of a strong devotion to the Virgin Mary; the emphasis given to the care and concern for each individual in the school community; and a particular concern for the poor. He also said that Christian Brothers' schools throughout the world had a remarkable similarity of purpose, spirit and tone. "Allowing for culture change a boy from St Peter's College in Auckland will fit in easily in Cardinal Newman College, Buenos Aires or Waverley College, Sydney, or St Columba's School, New Delhi, or St Edward's College, Liverpool, or in schools in twenty other countries."

Monsignor Paul Farmer (a pupil 1960-1965), the chaplain of the college at various times from the 1970s, and, the current chaplain, had a family connection with St Peter's going back to its opening in 1939, when his father was a first day pupil. Farmer stated that, in praising the work of the Christian Brothers at St Peters:

Recent history

After 50 years of leadership by Christian Brother headmasters, the school has been led by lay headmasters since 1989. In that time the roll increased significantly, for example, from 669 in 1989 to 1,344 students in 2015, and has remained around that level since. During the 1990s, as well as the renovation (and naming) of the Brother J. B. Lynch Science Laboratories, the Brother P. C Ryan sports pavilion replaced the original pavilion built in 1960 and which had been ruined by fire. The Brother W. R. Smith Music and Drama Suite was built. Brother Smith (1948–1953), the third headmaster of the college, had initiated the first school orchestra. The Brother L. H. Wilkes Technology Block was opened in 2001 (awarded the NZIA Resene Supreme Award for Architecture 2002 and the NZIA Resene Branch Award for Architecture 2001) and a dedicated building for the intermediate school ("the Middle School") on Mountain Road, named after Brother V.A. Sullivan, was occupied in 2003. The St Peter's College Sports Complex was erected on the old netball courts was opened on 21 September 2010 by the Governor-General of New Zealand, Sir Anand Satyanand, and was a 2012 Auckland Architecture Award winner. In 2015 a 12-classroom block was completed on Mountain Road and named the "Outhwaite Building," in honour of Isa Outhwaite, the donor of the school site.

St Peter's has continued to follow the objectives of the Christian Brothers' founder, 18th-century Irish merchant Blessed Edmund Rice, to encourage its members to serve the community in ways such as participation in Edmund Rice Camps and committing themselves to Rice's objective of bringing social justice.  All St Peter’s students are required to complete service work ("any unpaid work that is not for relatives") as part of their life at the College.  Christian Brothers missions in Polynesia were supported, particularly Nukutere College in Rarotonga and regular trips to India were organized for senior students. In supporting students' sporting and cultural aspirations, music, football and softball academies were established.

The school has set and achieve high academic standards and has won numerous awards in musical engagement and achieved substantial sporting successes. Culturally, it benefited from a diverse, multicultural diverse roll and cultural activities, also gaining awards in areas such as religion and polyfest (Polynesian cultural competitions).

The school was led by its first non-Christian Brother headmaster, Kieran Fouhy, for approximately 26 years from 1989 until 2015. 

The headmaster since 2016 is James Bentley. In that time the new chapel has been completed, a structure opened for cricket bowling practice (Watty's Nets) and other building projects are planned.

Headmasters
The following individuals have served as headmasters, or any precedent title, of the College:

Old boys and former staff

 List of people educated at St Peter's College, Auckland
 List of former staff of St Peter's College, Auckland
 Congregation of Christian Brothers in New Zealand

Some individual experiences at St Peter's College (1940s-1970s):

 Mark Williams - writer
 Sam Hunt - poet
 David McGill - writer
 John Tamihere - politician
 Frank Nobilo - golfer
 Felix Donnelly - priest
 Cyril Eastlake - footballer
 Colin Jillings - horse trainer
 Jonathan Temm - lawyer

For other experiences see: Matt Elliott, On This Rock: 75 Years of St Peter's College, Mountain Road, St Peter's College, Auckland, 2015.

See also 

 List of schools in New Zealand
 Education in New Zealand
 Catholic Church in New Zealand

Notes

References

Bibliography 
 No author; sorted by publication name
 
 
 
 
 
 
 
 
 
 
 
 

By author

External links
 St Peter's College website
 St Peter's College Old Boys Association

 
Cambridge schools in New Zealand
Art Deco architecture in New Zealand
Educational institutions established in 1841
Educational institutions established in 1857
School buildings completed in 1939
Educational institutions established in 1939
Boys' schools in New Zealand
Congregation of Christian Brothers secondary schools
Gummer and Ford buildings and structures
Catholic secondary schools in Auckland
Christianity in Auckland
History of Auckland
1939 establishments in New Zealand